Jairo Santiago Padilla Folleco (born May 10, 1991) is an Ecuadorian footballer who plays as a forward for El Nacional.

Honors
Aucas
Serie B: 2014

References

External links
in the Spanish Wikipedia 

1991 births
Living people
People from Ibarra, Ecuador
Association football forwards
Ecuadorian footballers
S.D. Aucas footballers
C.D. Trofense players
L.D.U. Quito footballers
C.S.D. Macará footballers
C.D. El Nacional footballers
Ecuadorian expatriate footballers
Expatriate footballers in Portugal